Hamshaw is an English surname. Notable people with the surname include:

Harper Hamshaw (1863–1925), English rugby union footballer
Matt Hamshaw (born 1982), English footballer

See also
Harshaw

English-language surnames